Rasin is a surname. Notable people with the surname include: 

 Alois Rašín (1867–1923), Czechoslovakian politician and economist
 Bengt Rasin (1922–2013), Swedish Navy officer
 Isaac Freeman Rasin (1833–1907), American politician